Richard May may refer to:

 Richard May (judge)  (1938–2004), British judge
 Richard May (cricketer) (died c. 1796), English cricketer for Kent
 Richard May (1863–1936), German physician who first described the May–Hegglin anomaly
 Richard May (politician) (c. 1638–1713), Member of Parliament for Chichester
 Richard May (speedway rider) (born 1944), British speedway rider
 Richard May, Apothecary to the Household at Windsor 1952–65
 Ricky May (1943–1988), New Zealand musician
 Dick May (1930–2009), NASCAR driver
 Dick May (footballer) (1910–1986), Australian rules footballer